The Tacuate are an indigenous people of Mexico who live in the state of Oaxaca. The Tacuate language is one of the Mixtec languages; in 2010, there were 1,500 speakers.

Most of the people are engaged in subsistence agriculture, with some keeping cattle and goats, and with women producing textile crafts for a source of cash. 
Land tenure is usually communal.
The Tacuate live in two municipalities in the Mixteca de la Costa area: Santa María Zacatepec in the Putla district and Santiago Ixtayutla in the Jamiltepec district.

See also
Indigenous people of Oaxaca

References

Indigenous peoples in Mexico
Oaxaca